Chasen was a Christian rock band from Greenville, South Carolina. The band is composed of Chase Callahan (lead vocals, guitar, keyboards), Evan Silver (guitar), Aaron Lord (drums) and bassist Doug Price. Their first album was the independent release Another Way of Life. In 2006 they were signed to OMG Records and recorded a promotional EP for Coca-Cola Dasani. The first song from the album, "Crazy Beautiful", charted in the Top 10 on the R&R magazine chart as of January 2008 and it was the 22nd most-played song of 2008 on U.S. Contemporary Christian music radio stations according to R&R magazine's Christian CHR chart. Their debut full-length studio album, Shine Through the Stars, was released on April 15, 2008 on OMG Records. The song "Drown" was also released as a radio single in 2008.

Their second album That Was Then, This Is Now was released on March 9, 2010 on INO Records.

Disbanding 

Chasen was disbanded in 2012. Lead singer Chase Callahan became a worship pastor at Marathon Church in Greenville, South Carolina. Since 2015, Callahan has taken over the worship environment of Fellowship Greenville in Greenville, South Carolina. Evan Silver, Jared Barber, and Wil Martin became staff members at NewSpring Church, a multi-site church based out of Anderson, South Carolina.

Band members 

 Chase Callahan – lead vocals, guitar, keyboards
 Evan Silver – guitar
 Aaron Lord – drums
 Doug Price – bass guitar
 Jamie Crumpton – guitar, background vocals
 Wil Martin – bass guitar, background vocals
 Clint Hudson – bass guitar, background vocals
 Phil Snowden – bass guitar, background vocals
 Jared Barber – bass guitar, lead vocals

Discography

Albums 

 Chasen – 2004
 Another Way of Life – 2006
 Shine Through the Stars – 2008
 That Was Then, This Is Now – 2010

Singles 

 "Crazy Beautiful" – peaked at No. 1 on Christian CHR, No. 22 for 2008
 "Drown"
 "On and On" – peaked at No. 1 for seven weeks on Christian R&R
 "Castaway" – Entered the charts at No. 22 on the R&R and stayed at No. 1 for five weeks
 "One in a Million"

References 

Christian rock groups from South Carolina
Fair Trade Services artists
Inpop Records artists